Tyrone Eugene Harris (born December 5, 1964) is an American former professional baseball pitcher, who played in Major League Baseball (MLB) in all or parts of seven seasons, from  to .

Early life
Harris was a 1982 graduate of Okeechobee High School. He attended Tulane University, where he played football as well as baseball. Harris accepted a scholarship to play football for the Tulane Green Wave with the expectation that he would also play on the baseball team. However, due to a change in coaching staffs, he was only allowed to play one season of college baseball.

Career
Harris was a fifth-round draft pick of the Montreal Expos in 1986.

He made it to the majors with Montreal to start the 1989 season but was sent down to Triple-A in early May. Later that month, he became part of a trade that the Expos would rue. They gave up future 300-game winner Randy Johnson along with Brian Holman and Harris to the Seattle Mariners for Mark Langston and a player to be named later. Langston left as a free agent after the season.

Harris was up and down between the Mariners and Triple-A during his time in the Seattle organization. In May 1992, he left the Mariners to attend his stepfather's funeral and did not return to the team when scheduled. His agent told the team that he wanted to quit baseball to pursue a career in the National Football League. Harris ultimately spent just two weeks away from baseball, after which he was traded to the San Diego Padres.

Harris enjoyed the  best year of his career in 1993, posting 23 saves for the Padres.

During the 1994 season, an injured and ineffective Harris lost his closer role with the Padres to Trevor Hoffman in mid-April. He was traded in May to the Detroit Tigers, for whom he pitched only 11 1/3 innings.

Harris signed as a free agent with the Philadelphia Phillies ahead of the 1995 season but was traded to the Baltimore Orioles in June. He made just three appearances for Baltimore before being sidelined with an injured elbow. He and underwent season-ending elbow surgery in August. At that point, his big-league career ended.

Harris pitched in the minors for the Pittsburgh Pirates organization in 1996. He was out of the game in 1997. He made a brief comeback for Norfolk, the Triple-A affiliate of the New York Mets, in 1998. That was his last action as a pro ballplayer.

References

External links

1964 births
Living people
African-American baseball players
American expatriate baseball players in Canada
Baltimore Orioles players
Baseball players from Florida
Burlington Expos players
Calgary Cannons players
Carolina Mudcats players
Detroit Tigers players
Indianapolis Indians players
Jacksonville Expos players
Jamestown Expos players
Las Vegas Stars (baseball) players
Major League Baseball pitchers
Montreal Expos players
Norfolk Tides players
People from Sebring, Florida
Philadelphia Phillies players
San Diego Padres players
Seattle Mariners players
Toledo Mud Hens players
Tulane Green Wave baseball players
West Palm Beach Expos players
Okeechobee High School alumni
21st-century African-American people
20th-century African-American sportspeople
Tulane Green Wave football players